Visoka polyana may refer to the following places in Bulgaria:

 Visoka polyana, Kardzhali Province
 Visoka polyana, Shumen Province